A list of films released in Italy in 2010 (see 2010 in film).

See also
2010 in Italian television

Notes

External links
Italian films of 2010 at the Internet Movie Database

2010
Films
Italian